was a Japanese author.

Personal life
A largely self-taught writer of humble social origins, Kuroshima was born on Shōdoshima in the Inland Sea and went to Tokyo to work and study. Conscripted into the army in 1919, he was sent to fight in a doomed war against the USSR waged at the time by Japan and its allies, including the US and Britain. Upon his return, Kuroshima joined a flourishing proletarian literature movement and published his narratives in a variety of journals. His passionately anti-imperialist novel was researched in China. As his health began to fail in the early 1930s, Kuroshima returned to his native island where he lived with his wife and three children.

Works
One of modern Japan's most dedicated antimilitarist intellectuals, Kuroshima Denji is best known for his Siberian stories of the late 1920svivid descriptions of agonies suffered by Japanese soldiers and Russian civilians during Japan's invasion of the newly emerged Soviet Union. Kuroshima also wrote powerful narratives dealing with the hardships, struggles, and rare triumphs of Japanese peasants. His only full-length novel, Militarized Streets, a shocking description of economic and military aggression against China, was censored not only by Japan's imperial government, but by the US occupation authorities as well.

Literary style
Kuroshima's narratives—like those of Anton Chekhov, whom Kuroshima greatly admired—are unadorned in style, straightforward in storytelling, and attentive to detail. Their content conveys a sense of authenticity, grief over the unnecessary suffering, and above all the urgent need for change. Despite occasional flashes of humor and lyricism, the tone is seldom cheerful and happy endings are rare: Kuroshima refrains from accomplishing in fiction what is much harder to attain in actuality. Devoid of easy optimism, his stories are open-ended chronicles of abuse and resistance.

Ultimately, Kuroshima is convinced, only a vast international movement based on grassroots solidarity stands a chance of replacing a heartless status quo with a sane, livable world of justice and generosity. Meanwhile, faced with the daily tragedies of an irrationally structured world, radical artists everywhere are bound to persevere in their oppositional work. In his 1929 essay 'On Antiwar Literature,' Kuroshima writes: "So long as the capitalist system exists, proletarian antiwar literature must also exist, and fight against it."

Further reading
 Kuroshima Denji, A FLOCK OF SWIRLING CROWS and Other Proletarian Writings. Trans. Zeljko Cipris. Honolulu: University of Hawai'i Press, 2005. The book presents ten of Kuroshima's most representative stories and his novel Militarized Streets.

See also
 
 Japanese literature
 List of Japanese authors
 Proletarian literature
 Shodoshima (Shodo Island)

External links 
 黒島 伝治：作家別作品リスト 
 Against the System: Antiwar Writing of Kuroshima Denji
 Kuroshima Denji (translation and introduction by Michael Bourdaghs), "The Two-Sen Copper Coin", The Asia-Pacific Journal, Vol. 12, Issue 43, No. 2, November 3, 2014

1898 births
1943 deaths
Japanese Marxists
20th-century Japanese novelists
Marxist writers
Proletarian literature
Imperial Japanese Army personnel